The  is a private tram system in Nagasaki, Japan. Since March 20, 2008, its lines accept Nagasaki Smart Card, a smart card ticketing system.

The company was founded on August 2, 1914, while the tram line was opened on November 16, 1915. It once operated bus lines as well, but went out from the division later in 1971.

The lines are stably making profits and they are the only tramway operator in Japan that has not lost any of its original lines. The current fare is ¥140 for adults and ¥70 for school aged children.

Line and routes
Only interchangeable stations are shown here.
Lines: Officially, there are five lines totaling 11.5 km.
Akasako Branch Line (赤迫支線): Akasako — Sumiyoshi
Main Line (本線): Sumiyoshi — Nagasaki-Ekimae — (Dejima) — Tsukimachi — Nishihamanomachi — Shōkakuji-shita
Sakuramachi Branch Line (桜町支線): Nagasaki-Ekimae — (Sakuramachi) — Kōkaidō-mae
Ōura Branch Line (大浦支線): Tsukimachi — Ishibashi
Hotarujaya Branch Line (蛍茶屋支線): Nishihamanomachi — Kōkaidō-mae — Hotarujaya
Routes: There are five routes regularly in service over one or more lines.  Route 2, however, only has 1 lap a day late at night. There are other temporary routes as well.
■ Route 1 (1系統): Akasako — Sumiyoshi — Nagasaki-Ekimae — (Dejima) — Tsukimachi — Nishihamanomachi — Shōkakuji-shita
□ Route 2 (2系統): Akasako — Sumiyoshi — Nagasaki-Ekimae — (Dejima) — Tsukimachi — Nishihamanomachi — Kōkaidō-mae — Hotarujaya
■ Route 3 (3系統): Akasako — Sumiyoshi — Nagasaki-Ekimae — (Sakuramachi) — Kōkaidō-mae — Hotarujaya
■ Route 4 (4系統): Hotarujaya — Kōkaidō-mae — Nishihamanomachi — Shōkakuji-shita
■ Route 5 (5系統): Hotarujaya — Kōkaidō-mae — Nishihamanomachi — Tsukimachi — Ishibashi

See also
List of light-rail transit systems

External links 
  Official website

Tram transport in Japan
Nagasaki
Transport in Nagasaki Prefecture
1914 establishments in Japan
Japanese companies established in 1914
Transport companies established in 1914